The Soloman Levy House is a historic house in Columbus, Ohio, United States. The house was built c. 1910-11 and was listed on the National Register of Historic Places in 1986. The Soloman Levy House was built at a time when East Broad Street was a tree-lined avenue featuring the most ornate houses in Columbus; the house reflects the character of the area at the time. The building is also part of the 18th & E. Broad Historic District on the Columbus Register of Historic Properties, added to the register in 1988.

The house is a significant example of early 20th century architecture, with elements of the Arts and Crafts movement and Prairie style.

See also
 National Register of Historic Places listings in Columbus, Ohio

References

Houses completed in 1910
National Register of Historic Places in Columbus, Ohio
Houses in Columbus, Ohio
Houses on the National Register of Historic Places in Ohio
Columbus Register properties
Broad Street (Columbus, Ohio)